Future Perfect Sound System: Music for Listening, a compilation of electronica, techno and trance music, is the first album by Twin Cities-based electronica collective Future Perfect Sound System. The album features work from a diverse range of electronica genres, and was organized and orchestrated by Minneapolis producer Chris Strouth.

Track listing

References

1997 albums